Imboden District is a former administrative district in the canton of Graubünden, Switzerland. It was replaced with the Imboden Region on 1 January 2017 as part of a reorganization of the Canton.

It consisted of two Kreise (sub-districts) and seven municipalities:

Languages

References

Districts of Graubünden